Aerophilately is the branch of philately that specializes in the study of airmail. Philatelists have observed the development of mail transport by air from its beginning, and all aspects of airmail service have been extensively studied and documented by specialists.

Scope 
The scope of aerophilately includes:
airmail postage stamps, both official and unofficial (see list of US airmail postage here)
other types of labels (such as airmail etiquettes)
postal documents transmitted by air
postal markings related to air transport
rates and routes, particularly first flights and other "special" flights
mail recovered from aircraft accidents and other incidents (crash covers)

While most of the study of airmail assumes transport by fixed-wing aircraft, the fields of balloon mail, dirigible mail, zeppelin mail, missile mail, and rocket mail are active subspecialties. Astrophilately, the study of mail in space, is a related area.

Organizations
International Federation of Aerophilatelic Societies, (FISA), is the umbrella organization for aerophilately though aerophilatelists have formed a number of organizations around the world; many of them put out a variety of specialized publications. Federation Internationale de Philatelie (FIP) also maintains a commission.

See also
Airmail
Airmail stamps of Denmark
Airmails of the United States
Fitzgerald Collection
List of United States airmail stamps
Scott Collection A collection of British internal airmails.
Seymour Collection A collection relating to the de Havilland Comet.

References

Further reading
Richard McP. Cabeen, Standard Handbook of Stamp Collecting (Collectors Club, 1979), pp. 207–221
Cheryl Ganz, ed. Collecting Air Mail (American Air Mail Society)
American Air Mail Catalogue (AAMS, 6th ed. 1998)

William Victor Kriebel, A History of the Development of Air Mail Service in Brazil (AAMS)
William J. Murphy, Irish Airmail 1919-1990 (Irish Airmail Society, 1996)

 
 
 
 
Gérard Collot and Alain Cornu, ''Ligne Mermoz, catalog of French airmail flight covers, 1919-1940

External links
FIP Commission for Aerophilately
Air Mail Society of New Zealand
American Air Mail Society
British Air Mail Society
Fédération Internationale des Sociétés Aérophilatéliques
Irish Airmail Society
Metropolitan Air Post Society
 Aerophilately Resources

Airmail
Philatelic terminology